The Architecture of Delhi dates back more than a thousand years. As the capital of several great empires of India, including  Rajput kingdom, Delhi Sultanate, Mughal Empire, and British Raj, the city of Delhi has been a centre for art and architecture.

Rajput Kingdom 
The few surviving structures from before the Delhi Sultanate period include Agrasen ki Baoli, Surajkund reservoir, Lal Kot and Qila Rai Pithora. There were several temples built during this period, remnants of which are still present in Qutb complex.
rajput is derived from the Hindi word "rajputra" meaning "the son of the ruler"

Delhi Sultanate 
The Delhi Sultanate ruled the city between 1206 and 1526. Their rule saw the development of early Indo-Islamic architecture, the most prominent being the Qutb Minar complex, a group of monuments surrounding the Qutb Minar. This period also saw building of many forts and cities like Siri Fort, Tughlaqabad and Feroz Shah Kotla. Many tombs were built around this period which are still present in many locations like Qutb Minar complex, Hauz Khas Complex and Lodi Gardens.

Mughal Empire 
Mughal Architecture emerged as a form of Indo-Islamic architecture during the rule of the Mughal Empire. Mughal architecture is characterized by large bulbous onion domes, the use of white marble and red sandstone, delicate ornamentation work, and large buildings surrounded by gardens on all four sides.

The Humayun's Tomb is the first notable example of Mughal architecture in Delhi. Except for a few architectures like Humayun's Tomb and Purana Qila, most of the architectural work of this period was done in Shah Jahan's time or later. This period also saw building of 18th century Astronomical Observatory called Jantar Mantar.

Another important achievement of this period was building of Mughal gardens. Its design was inspired by persian Char Bagh Gardens. Some gardens built during Mughal period are garden built in front of Humayun's Tomb, Roshanara Bagh, Qudsia Bagh and Garden built in Safdarjang's tomb complex.

British Colonial period 
After Delhi was declared the site for a new capital of India, George V laid the foundation of New Delhi, which would serve as the capital. The British invited Edwin Lutyens and Herbert Baker to design the government buildings. This area would also be called Lutyens' Delhi in honor of the architect. Members of Lutyens' team of architects included Walter Sykes George, Arthur Gordon Shoosmith and Henry Medd. It is reported that Lutyens was reluctant to incorporate Indian features in his style, but later conceded.

Post-Independence 
The Supreme Court of India was designed by Ganesh Bhikaji Deolalikar in the same style as that of the other major buildings in Lutyens' Delhi. However, modernist architecture became prevalent in Delhi as well as all over India, especially after the influence of Le Corbusier.

After Independence, the best examples of modern architecture in Delhi include IIT Delhi (1961) by Jugal Kishore Chodhury, Hall of Nations (1972) and Asian Games Village (1982) by Raj Rewal, Palika Kendra building (1984) by Kuldip Singh, and Lotus Temple (1986) by Fariborhz Sahba.

In 2017, the demolition of the Hall of Nations received worldwide condemnation from architectural enthusiasts. It was considered to be one of the best examples of modernist architecture in India.

References 

Architecture in India
Delhi